Jorge Carrera Andrade was an Ecuadorian poet, historian, author, and diplomat during the 20th century. He was born in Quito, Ecuador in 1902. He died in 1978. During his life and after his death he has been recognized with Jorge Luis Borges, Vicente Huidobro, Gabriela Mistral, Pablo Neruda, Octavio Paz and Cesar Vallejo as one of the most important Latin American poets of the twentieth century.

Writing and diplomatic career
His writing was published in Aurora Estrada y Ayala's literary magazine, "Proteo" which she started in 1922. Other contributors to the magazine included future Nobel Laureate Gabriela Mistral. 

From 1928 to 1933 Carrera first experienced traveling in Europe. He served as Ecuadorian Consul in Peru, France, Japan and the United States. Later he became Ambassador to Venezuela, the United Kingdom, Nicaragua, France, Belgium, and the Netherlands. He also served as Secretary of State of Ecuador.

While living in the United States, Carrera developed many literary relationships with American writers, in particular Muna Lee whose critically acclaimed translation of his poetry, Secret Country, was published in 1946. His work was praised and championed by John Malcolm Brinnin, H.R. Hays, Archibald MacLeish, Carl Sandburg, William Jay Smith and William Carlos Williams. Carrera Andrade's poetic work developed for half a century in a number of volumes published worldwide.

In 1972 his Obra poetica completa, which gathers the totality of his lyric work, appeared in Quito. Most of his poetry has been translated into French, English, Italian and German. He also published books of essays, history and an autobiography, El volcan y el colibri (The Volcano and the Hummingbird) (1970).

After Carrera's diplomatic career ended in 1969, he was appointed distinguished visiting professor at Stony Brook University on Long Island, where he lectured for two academic years. He spent his last years in his native city of Quito, as director of the National Library of Ecuador. During his life and after his death he has been recognized with Jorge Luis Borges, Pablo Neruda, Octavio Paz and Cesar Vallejo as one of the most important Latin American poets of the twentieth century.

A celebrated poet
In 2002 the Republic of Ecuador celebrated the century of his birth. In the same year a group of Ecuadorian intellectuals gathered in Cuenca, Ecuador, to examine the life and work of Carrera Andrade.

Bibliography

Prose In English
 Carrera Andrade, Jorge, "The New American and His Point of View Toward Poetry," tr. H.R. Hays, Poetry (Chicago), LXII, 1943, P. 88–105
 H.R. Hays, "Jorge Carrera Andrade: Magician of Metaphors", Books Abroad (Norman, OK), XVII, No. 2, 1943, P. 101–105.

Books In English
 Micrograms, tr. Alejandro de Acosta and Joshua Beckman, Seattle: Wave Books, 2011 (essay, poetry). 
 Microgramas, tr. Steven Ford Brown and J. Enrique Ojeda, Quito: Orogenia Corporacion Cultural, 2007 (essay, poetry). 
 Century of The Death of The Rose: The Selected Poems of Jorge Carrera Andrade, 1926–1976, tr. Steven Ford Brown, Louisville and Montgomery: NewSouth Books, 2002 (poetry).
 Reflections on Latin American Literature, tr. Don and Gabriela C. Bliss, Albany: SUNY Press, 1973 (essays).
 The Selected Poems of Jorge Carrera Andrade, tr. H.R. Hays, Albany: SUNY press, 1972 (poetry).
 Secret Country, tr. Muna Lee, New York: MacMillan, 1946 (poetry).
 To The Oakland Bridge, tr. Eleanor Turnbull, Palo Alto: Stanford University Press, 1941 (poetry).

Books In Spanish
Autobiography
 The Volcano and The Hummingbird, Puebla, Mexico: Editorial Jose M. Caijica Jr., S.A., 1970.

Essays
 Interpretations of Hispano-America, Quito: Casa de la Cultura Ecuatoriana, 1967.
 Latitudes, Quito: Talleres Graficos Nacionales, 1934; Buenos Aires: Editor "Parseo",1940.
 History (A three volume history of Ecuador)
 The Kingdom of Quito or Street of The Sun, Quito: Case de la Cultura Ecuatriana, 1963.
 Gallery of Mystics and Insurgents, Quito: Casa de la Ecuatoriana, 1959.
 Earth Always Green, Paris: Ediciones Internacionales, 1955.

Memoir
 Traveller Through Countries and Books, Quito: Casa de la Cultura Ecuatoriana, 1961.

Poetry
 Poesia ultima, ed. with introduction, J. Enrique Qjeda, New York: Las Americas Publishing Co., 1968. 
 Planetary Man, Quito: Editorial Elan, 1963.
 Family of Night, Paris: Libreria Espanola de Ediciones, 1953.
 Place of Origin, Caracas: Editions: Suma, 1944.
 Secret Country, Tokyo, Editions Aisa America, 1940.
 Anthology of Pierre Reverdy, Tokyo: Editions Asia America, 1939.
 Biography for The Use Of Birds, Paris: Cuadernos del Hombre Nuevo, 1937; French translation by Edmond Vandercammen, Brussels: Les Cahiers du Journal des Poetes, 1937.
 Time Manual, Madrid: Editions Literatura: PEN Coleccion, 1935; French translation by Adolphe de Falgairolle, Paris: Editions Rene Debresse, 1936.
 Earth and Sea Bulletines (Foreword by Gabriela Mistral), Barcelona: Editorial Cervantes, 1930.
 Indian Poems, Quito: Editorial Elan, 1928.
 Wreath of Silence, Quito: Casa de la Cultura Ecuatoriana, 1926.

References

External links
The Official Jorge Carrera Andrade Website 
The Rediscovery of Jorge Carrera Andrade: A Celebration at Assumption College, An Introduction by Steven Ford Brown
"Jorge Carrera Andrade in America" (Jacket magazine (Australia), July 2000)
Steven Ford Brown, Twelve Poems by Jorge Carrera Andrade (Jacket magazine (Australia), July 2000)
Jorge Carrera Andrade Special Collection, Stony Brook University Libraries
J. Enrique Ojeda: Specialist on Jorge Carrera Andrade
Three Poems by Jorge Carrera Andrade (The Cortland Review, May 1999)
Biografia de Jorge Carrera Andrade (Biografias y vidas)
Yashar Ahad Saremi, Poem by Jorge Carrera Andrade translated into Persian (World Literature, June 20, 2008)
H.R. Hays, "Jorge Carrera Andrade: Magician of Metaphors" (Jacket magazine (Australia), July 2000)

Ecuadorian male writers
Ecuadorian poets
Ecuadorian diplomats
1900s births
1978 deaths
People from Quito
Ambassadors of Ecuador to Venezuela
Ambassadors of Ecuador to the United Kingdom
Ambassadors of Ecuador to Nicaragua
Ambassadors of Ecuador to France
Ambassadors of Ecuador to Belgium
Ambassadors of Ecuador to the Netherlands
20th-century poets
20th-century male writers